was a Japanese professional go player, and head of the Inoue house  from 1824–1846. He proposed a changed numbering that made him the eleventh head (rather than tenth), by including Doseki at the head of the list.

At various times he was known as Hattori Rittetsu, Inoue Ansetsu, Intetsu, Gennan Inseki, Inoue Gennan Inseki. A talented player at the highest level, but unlucky in practical terms. He was involved in one of the most famous games, the so-called Ear-reddening game against Hon'inbō Shūsaku.

External links
Article at Sensei's Library

1798 births
1859 deaths
Japanese Go players
19th-century Go players